Anthony Perez may refer to:

 Anthony Perez (cyclist) (born 1991), French cyclist 
 Anthony Pérez (basketball) (born 1993), Venezuelan basketball player